The Devon Ice Cap is an ice cap on eastern Devon Island, Nunavut, Canada, covering an area of over .

The first ascent of the Devon Ice Cap was by Alfred Herbert Joy and his Inuit companions in 1926.

Geology
The Devon Ice Cap and the Agassiz Ice Cap on the neighboring Ellesmere Island are two of the largest ice caps in the Arctic Cordillera in the Canadian Arctic, and consist of a substantial fraction of ice not locked away in the Antarctic and Greenland ice sheets. As such, should the entire Devon Ice Cap melt due to global warming, the ice will contribute approximately 1 centimeter to global sea level rise.

The Devon Ice Cap has a dome-like structure and a maximum elevation of 1921 m above sea level at its summit, and the maximum ice thickness is 880 m. There are two distinct regions in the Devon Ice Cap: a  ice cap and a  ice-covered region in the west that is geologically inactive. Beneath the ice, two hypersaline subglacial lakes have been identified via RES in bedrock troughs. Subglacial valleys have also been found, and such structures are thought to control the outflow of ice.

See also
Retreat of glaciers since 1850
List of Ultras of North America

References

External links
 "Devon Ice Cap" on Mountain-forecast.com

Ice caps of Canada
Bodies of ice of Qikiqtaaluk Region
Arctic Cordillera
Devon Island